The Aviatik C.IX was a prototype German observation aircraft built by Aviatik in the final months of World War I.

Design
The C.IX was a development of the C.VIII with a nine-cylinder Benz Bz.IV engine with a capacity of 200 hp. The aircraft's armament consisted of a synchronized 7.92-mm machine gun LMG 08/15 Spandau and one 7.92-mm machine gun LMG 14 Parabellum on a turret mounted in the rear cabin. 

Three prototype aircraft were built (Wk.n. 6306/18-6308/18). The two prototypes had ailerons on both wings, while the third had ailerons only on the upper wing. The prototypes also differed from each other in the form of the tail.

Specifications

References

Further reading

External links

1910s German military reconnaissance aircraft
C.IX
Single-engined tractor aircraft
Biplanes
Aircraft first flown in 1918